Dinogorgon is a genus of gorgonopsid from the Late Permian of South Africa and Tanzania. The generic name Dinogorgon is derived from Greek, meaning "terrible gorgon", while its species name rubidgei is taken from the surname of renowned Karoo paleontologist, Professor Bruce Rubidge, who has contributed to much of the research conducted on therapsids of the Karoo Basin. The type species of the genus is D. rubidgei.

Dinogorgon is part of the gorgonopsian subfamily Rubidgeinae, a derived group of large-bodied gorgonopsians restricted to the Late Permian (Lopingian). The Rubidgeinae subfamily first appeared in the Tropidostoma Assemblage Zone, and reached their highest diversity in the Cistecephalus and Daptocephalus assemblage zones of the Beaufort Group in South Africa.

History of discovery 

The type species of Dinogorgon rubidgei was discovered on Wellwood farm, a farm owned by the grandfather of Bruce Rubidge, Sidney H. Rubidge, outside of Graaff-Reinet. The fossil was likely recovered by Haughton himself sometime in the 1930s or 1940s, and were only described by British paleontologist, Sidney H. Haughton, and James Kitching between 1953 and 1965.

Description 

It was a formidable predator, and likely preyed on reptiles and smaller therapsids. Like more derived rubidgeines, Dinogorgon had a number of bosses on its skull, likely to reduce the stresses caused by struggling prey. Its snout was deep but narrow, similar to Aelurognathus, but narrower than Rubidgea and Clelandina. It had 4 to 5 upper and lower postcanine teeth, which further distinguishes it from Rubidgea. Three subspecies are currently recognised in the genus: D. rubidgei, D. quinquemolaris, and D. pricei.

Classification 
 
The Rubidgeinae are a subfamily of derived gorgonopsids that have only been found in Africa. They are composed of six genera and 17 species. The Rubidgeinae are closely related to their sister group, the Inostranceviinae, which have only been found in Russia. Out of the gorgonopsian clade, the systematics of the Rubidgeinae are the best resolved due to their distinctive character traits. The systematics of other gorgonopsian subfamilies remain chaotic due to a high degree of cranial homomorphism between taxa, making it difficult to distinguish different taxa effectively.

Dinogorgon shares many characteristics with Rubidgea and Clelandina, which has led some authors to synonymize them. All three are now considered to be part of the same tribe, Rubidgeini, rather than the same genus. The cladogram below (Kammerer et al. 2016) displays currently accepted systematic relationships of the Gorgonopsia.

Correlation 
Numerous therapsid species, including rubidgenae gorgonopsids, are used as biostratigraphic markers in other African basins, such as the Upper Madumabisa Mudstone of Zambia, the Usili Formation of Tanzania, and the Chiweta Beds of Malawi.

Gallery

References 

Gorgonopsia
Prehistoric therapsid genera
Lopingian synapsids of Africa
Lopingian genus first appearances
Lopingian genus extinctions
Permian South Africa
Fossils of South Africa
Fossils of Tanzania
Fossils of Zambia
Fossil taxa described in 1936
Taxa named by Robert Broom